Kevin Bartlett (born 25 May 1940 in Coffs Harbour, New South Wales), often known by his nickname "KB", is an Australian former open wheel and touring car racing driver who won the Australian Drivers' Championship in 1968 and 1969, as well as the prestigious Bathurst 1000 in 1974. Bartlett was named in Wheels magazine's annual yearbook in 2004 as one of Australia's 50 greatest race drivers.  He placed #15 on the list.

Racing career
Bartlett first arrived on the Australian racing scene in 1958 when he competed in the Touring Car Scratch Race at Bathurst, driving a 950cc Morris Minor.

Over the next few years, Bartlett progressed through the levels of Australian motorsport before his big break came when he was hired to drive for 1960 Australian Grand Prix winner Alec Mildren in the Tasman Series of open wheel racing. Bartlett proved competitive in this series and would become a fixture of Alec Mildren Racing for the next decade racing a long line of open-wheel racing cars and Alfa Romeo touring cars. Bartlett won the 1965 International 6 Hour Touring Car Race for the Mildren team, driving an Alfa Romeo TI Super with Frank Gardner and he also won the 1967 Surfers Paradise Four Hour, driving a similar car with Doug Chivas.

Bartlett got his first works drive via motoring journalist and part time rally driver Evan Green at Bathurst driving a Morris Mini de Luxe for the BMC team in the 1965 Armstrong 500.

At the 1967 Bathurst Easter meeting, Bartlett became the first driver to ever lap the 6.172 km mountain circuit at an average speed of over 100 mph driving a 1964 Repco Brabham BT11A Climax.

In 1969 Kevin Bartlett took his Mildren-Alfa Romeo to the win at the Macau Grand Prix for Formula Libre cars. Bartlett considers the win as one of the highlights of his motor racing career. He returned to the event in 2019 for the 50th anniversary of his win.

In 1970, Bartlett traveled to the United States to compete in the USAC Championship (aka Indy Car) series, attempting and failing to qualify for the Indianapolis 500. Bartlett competed in three other Indy Car races, but failed to finish.

Bartlett was signed on to co-drive with John Goss in the 1973 Bathurst 1000, in a brand-new Ford XA Falcon GT Hardtop.  They qualified on pole position for the race and led for over three-and-a-half hours, but crashed out of the race on lap 110.  They returned the following year and won the event with Bartlett holding off the Bob Forbes Torana and bringing the Goss Falcon home in the rain. Bartlett's Bathurst-winning drive in 1974 was achieved while he still carried hip and pelvis injuries from a major crash at the Pukekohe round of the Tasman Series nine months earlier.

Bartlett was a fixture of Formula 5000 throughout the 70s with a series of Lolas and briefly the unique Brabham BT43 Formula 5000. As the decade closed and Formula 5000 declined, Bartlett returned to touring cars, developing the American Chevrolet Camaro Z28 for Australian Group C with the partnership of Kerry Packer's television network the Nine Network. The car (which Bartlett had purchased new from Unser Chevrolet in New Mexico) debuted, without Bartlett, at the 1979 Bathurst 1000. Bartlett was to co-drive with Bob Forbes in the James Hardie 1000, but a bad F5000 crash in the Brabham BT43 at the Sandown Gold Star Round on 9 September 1979 saw KB watch the race from a wheelchair nursing a broken arm and leg with F5000 and Sports Sedan racer John McCormack taking his place in the car.

KB was back in 1980 and was the only driver to seriously challenge the Marlboro Holden Dealer Team Commodore of Peter Brock in the 1980 Australian Touring Car Championship. Bartlett would go on to take pole position for the 1980 Hardie-Ferodo 1000 at Bathurst in the Camaro but his race was soured by the car being forced to run drum brakes on the rear with his first stop to change the rear drums coming after only 14 laps (guest Channel 7 pit reporter Chris Economaki reported that the drums were so hot when they came off the car that they literally blistered the paint on the inside pit wall). Later in the race Bartlett tangled with a baby car class Isuzu Gemini on top of The Mountain simply because he had run out of brakes and couldn't stop in time. The Gemini rolled and after coming into the pits Bartlett told a national television audience that he was sorry for the incident but that the blame lay squarely with CAMS regulations not allowing the Camaro's to run 4-wheel disc brakes. In the interview he told Channel 7's Evan Green "And of course with our stupid bloody CAMS rules not allowing us to have disc brakes in the back this thing just doesn't stop, its bloody dangerous out there without discs. And I just hit him, and just rolled him. You know sure he made a mistake, but in a normal situation I should have been able to slow up enough. This car doesn't stop, it slows up. That's the difference".

Bartlett only contested two rounds of the 1981 Australian Touring Car Championship in the Camaro, which by now was allowed to run 4 wheel disc brakes making it a much safer and much more formidable challenger. He then chose not to race in the 1981 Hang Ten 400 at Sandown, but still went to Bathurst as one of the favourites. He claimed his second pole in a row on The Mountain in frightfully wet conditions, recording a time that was 15.46 seconds slower than he had been 12 months earlier. After a good start where he was dicing with Brock's Holden Commodore and the Ford Falcon's of Dick Johnson and Bob Morris (who would eventually finish 1st and 2nd respectively), a number of small problems, including a crash with the Commodore of Ron Wanless saw the Camaro finally finish 13th, 11 laps down on Johnson. The crash with Wanless prompted a fired up KB to tell Channel 7 that "A complete and utter amateur nincumpoop got in the way" and that he was "Going to punch him in the mouth when the race was over", though he later told that he thankfully didn't go through with it after finding out that Wanless was also a semi-professional boxer.

The Camaro was coming towards the end of its development in 1982. He finished equal third on points with Allan Moffat in the 1982 Australian Touring Car Championship, winning his final ATCC race at Sydney's Oran Park in Round 4. He then enlisted the services of Colin Bond to be his co-driver in the Australian Endurance Championship. Bond drove the Camaro in the 250 km Perrier Gold Cup at Oran Park where the car was competitive but suffered tyre problems. They then went to the James Hardie 1000 at Bathurst as a strong contender for their third straight pole position, but suffered a set-back in qualifying when a tyre blew on top of The Mountain, sending bond into the guardrail. Despite this Bartlett qualified the car in 4th place. KB then had an early race duel for third place with the Falcon of Dick Johnson and the second Dealer Team Commodore of John Harvey which went on for a number of laps. Bartlett's race ended on lap 27 when the Camaro blew its left rear tyre at Reid Park, sending him into the fence and causing the car to roll onto its roof and slide across the track with a close following Johnson only just missing him.

Kevin Bartlett's final race in the Camaro came in the Oran Park round of the 1983 ATCC, though by this time he was not competitive and he only recorded a 9th-place finish. He then went on to be Dick Johnson's co-driver in the 1983 James Hardie 1000, though the race weekend was a disaster for the team after Johnson's Hardie's Heroes crash at Forrest's Elbow destroyed the Greens-Tuf Falcon. A car swapping deal was then done and the team had another Falcon ready to run for the race, but the hastily built Ford was well off the pace and was eventually retired on lap 61.

Bartlett's autobiography entitled "Big Rev Kev" was published in 1983.

In 1984, Bartlett headed Mitsubishi's first factory backed attack on the Bathurst 1000 with the Mitsubishi Starion turbo running in the new Group A class that would become uniform in 1985. Unfortunately Bathurst would prove problematic for the team with the cars being forced to run components that weren't compatible with the engine's electronics and the car was uncompetitive. Bartlett then led Mitsubishi's first assault on the Australian Touring Car Championship in 1985, finishing in a fine 3rd place in the opening round at Winton, but ultimately dropping to 9th in the series as the established teams got their Group A cars up to speed. He and motoring journalist Peter McKay then went on to finish 9th outright and second in class in the 1985 James Hardie 1000 at Bathurst.

During 1985, Bartlett also drove a ground effects De Tomaso Pantera designed and built by ex-Formula One mechanic and Kaditcha racing cars owner Barry Lock to finish 4th in the 1985 Australian GT Championship. Bartlett only drove in the opening round of the 1986 ATCC at Amaroo Park in a privately entered Starion (though he would not complete enough laps to be classified as a finisher), and would join the Frank Gardner run JPS Team BMW as a co-driver in the team's second BMW 635 CSi for the Sandown 500 and the James Hardie 1000 where he would co-drive with New Zealander Trevor Crowe. Unfortunately the BMW was a non finisher in both races.

In 1987, Bartlett drove a Maserati Biturbo for World Touring Car Championship team Pro Team Italia on their visit to Australia and New Zealand. While the Maserati was, on paper, a strong contender, in reality the car was under developed and well off the pace and although driving with 1985 Bathurst winner Armin Hahne and ex-Formula One driver Bruno Giacomelli (who failed to qualify at Bathurst), the car only lasted 29 laps of the race.

1988 saw Bartlett team with longtime rival John Harvey in a Bob Forbes owned Holden VL Commodore SS Group A SV in the Tooheys 1000 at Bathurst. After the new car had some teething problems in practice, they would start 22nd on the grid. The car initially raced faster than it qualified and Harvey (who started) was soon into the top 10 and battling with the BMW M3 of Peter Brock, but was forced to pit after 20 laps with a clutch problem. Ultimately they would finish in 14th place, 21 laps down on the winners.

After another start in a privately entered Mitsubishi Starion turbo in the 1989 Tooheys 1000, Bartlett's final drive in racing was the 1990 Tooheys 1000, sharing a Holden Commodore with Russell Ingall and open wheel star Rohan Onslow, again in a car owned by the man he beat to win the 1974 Bathurst 1000, Bob Forbes.

According to Bartlett, the 1990 Tooheys 1000 nearly killed him. The night before the race the team had bled the car's water system and unfortunately left the heater tap on which was not discovered until after the race. The result was that both Bartlett and Ingall suffered from dehydration with Bartlett collapsing in the pits and being placed on a drip after his driving stint (making matters worse was during his stint Bartlett knocked his water bottle over and had nothing to drink). Onslow, who was cross entered in the car and was the co-driver of the team's lead Commodore with Mark Gibbs, was forced to finish the race in the #13 car as neither Bartlett nor Ingall could do so. A couple of months after the race, Bartlett suffered a heart attack which required a quadruple bypass, effectively ending his 32-year racing career. His specialists put his heart attack down to the trauma he suffered during the race.

Retirement
In his retirement Bartlett works part-time to maintain the famous Bowden collection of historic racing cars, which includes Bartlett's Chevrolet Camaro.

On 24 October 2000, Bartlett was awarded the Australian Sports Medal for his motor racing achievements.

Career results

Complete Tasman Series results

American Open-Wheel
(key) (Races in bold indicate pole position)

USAC Indycars

Complete Australian Touring Car Championship results
(key) (Races in bold indicate pole position) (Races in italics indicate fastest lap)

* 2nd in class in 1960. Outright result not known.

Complete World Touring Car Championship results
(key) (Races in bold indicate pole position) (Races in italics indicate fastest lap)

Complete Asia-Pacific Touring Car Championship results
(key) (Races in bold indicate pole position) (Races in italics indicate fastest lap)

Complete Bathurst 500/1000 results

Complete 24 Hours of Daytona results

References

External links
Kevin Bartlett, MyF5000.com
Kevin Bartlett, Driver Database
Kevin Bartlett, Racing Reference (US results)

1940 births
Australian Formula 2 drivers
Australian Touring Car Championship drivers
Bathurst 1000 winners
Living people
People from Coffs Harbour
Racing drivers from New South Wales
Tasman Series drivers
World Touring Car Championship drivers
Recipients of the Australian Sports Medal
Australian Endurance Championship drivers
Dick Johnson Racing drivers